Jeanne Mas is the eponymously titled debut album from French pop singer Jeanne Mas. The music is entirely written by Romano Musumarra who also worked with artists such as Elsa Lunghini and Princess Stephanie of Monaco, the album peaked at #5 for two months on the French Albums Chart and achieved Gold status.

Track listing
"Parle et ça passe" (Jeanne Mas, Massimo Calabrese, Piero Calabrese, Romano Musumarra) – 4:23
"Johnny, Johnny" (J. Mas, R. Musumarra) – 4:21
"Lisa" (J. Mas, R. Musumarra) – 4:12
"Toute première fois" (J. Mas, R. Musumarra, Roberto Zaneli) – 4:15
"Suspens" (J. Mas, R. Musumarra) – 4:43
"Coeur en stéréo" (J. Mas, P. Calabrese, R. Musumarra) – 4:30
"Oh Mama" (J. Mas, M. Calabrese, P. Calabrese, R. Musumarra) – 4:15
"Loin d'ici" (J. Mas, Lorenzo Meinardi, R. Musumarra) – 3:50
"Pas de chanson" (J. Mas, M. Calabrese, P. Calabrese, R. Musumarra) – 3:40
"Flash" (J. Mas, M. Calabrese, P. Calabrese, R. Musumarra) – 3:36

Album credits

Personnel
Jeanne Mas - vocals
Romano Musumarra - guitar, bass, keyboards, drum programming
Walter Martino - drums
Michele Martusciello - horn
Yves Chouard - guitar ("Cœur en stéréo" & "Oh mama")
Christian Padovan – bass ("Cœur en stéréo" & "Oh mama")
Hervé Limeretz - keyboards ("Cœur en stéréo" & "Oh mama")
Daniel Balavoine - keyboards ("Cœur en stéréo" & "Oh mama")
Joe Hammer - drums ("Cœur en stéréo" & "Oh mama")

Production
Arrangements & producer - Romano Musumarra
Producers - Daniel Balavoine, Andy Scott, Joe Hammer ("Cœur en stéréo" & "Oh mama")
Engineer - Gianpaolo Bresciani at Titania Studios
Engineer - Andy Scott at Studio du Palais des Congrès ("Cœur en stéréo" & "Oh mama")
Assistant engineer - Frédéric Defay ("Cœur en stéréo" & "Oh mama")
Mixing - Dominique Blanc-Francard at Studio Continental, Paris
Assistant mixing - Patricia Guen
Production manager - Gérard Jardillier
Management - Nicolas Dunoyer

Design
Photography - Tato, Claude Gassian, Vincent/Stills

Charts, certifications and sales

References

External links
 Official site

1985 debut albums
Jeanne Mas albums
Pathé-Marconi albums